John Iliffe may refer to:

John Iliffe (dentist) (1846–1914), British-born Australian dentist
John Iliffe (computer designer) (born 1931), inventor of the Iliffe vector and pioneer of descriptor-based computer architectures
John Iliffe (historian) (born 1939), British professor of African history
John Wesley Iliff (1831-1878), cattle rancher and founder of the Iliff School of Theology